Piazza Italia or Piazza d'Italia may refer to:

 Piazza Italia, Naples
 Piazza Italia, Reggio Calabria
 Piazza d'Italia, Sassari
 Piazza d'Italia, New Orleans
 Piazza Italia (restaurant), Portland, Oregon, U.S.